On-Demand Publishing, LLC, doing business as CreateSpace, is a self-publishing service owned by Amazon. The company was founded in 2000 in South Carolina as BookSurge and was acquired by Amazon in 2005.

History
CreateSpace publishes books containing any content at all, other than just placeholder text. It neither edits nor verifies. Books are printed on demand, meaning each volume is produced in response to an actual purchase on Amazon.

CreateSpace continued its publishing services for 8 years until its transfer to Amazon's Media on Demand. By 2018, it has published 1,416,384 books for over 15,000 authors.

In July 2018, CreateSpace announced it would be transferring media to Amazon's Media on Demand services in the following months. CreateSpace merged with Amazon's Kindle Direct Publishing (KDP) service later that year.

See also
Audiobook Creation Exchange (ACX)
List of books published by CreateSpace

References

External links

2000 establishments in South Carolina
Amazon (company) acquisitions
Publishing companies based in California
Self-publishing companies
American companies established in 2000
Companies based in Santa Cruz County, California
2005 mergers and acquisitions